Oleg Nikolayevich Khopyorsky (born 26 May 1959) is a sailor from Gudauta, Soviet Union. who represented Russia at the 2000 Summer Olympics in Sydney, Australia as crew member in the Soling. With helmsman Georgy Shayduko and fellow crew member Andrey Kirilyuk they took the 6th place.

References

External links
 
 
 

1959 births
Living people
Russian male sailors (sport)
Soviet male sailors (sport)
Olympic sailors of Russia
Olympic sailors of the Unified Team
Olympic sailors of the Soviet Union
Sailors at the 1988 Summer Olympics – Finn
Sailors at the 1992 Summer Olympics – Finn
Sailors at the 1996 Summer Olympics – Finn
Sailors at the 2000 Summer Olympics – Soling
People from Gudauta